is a passenger railway station located in Iwatsuki-ku, Saitama, Japan, operated by the private railway operator Tōbu Railway. The station is numbered "TD-06".

Lines

Station layout
The station consists of one side platform and one island platform serving three tracks, connected to the station building by a footbridge.

Platforms

Adjacent stations

History

It was renamed Iwatsuki on 10 June 1939.

From 17 March 2012, station numbering was introduced on all Tōbu lines, with Iwatsuki Station becoming "TD-06".
The station building was rebuilt as a new overhead station during fiscal 2014.

Passenger statistics
In fiscal 2019, the station was used by an average of 36,935 passengers daily.

Surrounding area
Site of Iwatsuki Castle
Saitama City Iwatsuki Ward Office
Iwatsuki Post Office

See also
 List of railway stations in Japan

References

External links

 Tobu station information 

Railway stations in Saitama (city)
Tobu Noda Line
Stations of Tobu Railway
Railway stations in Japan opened in 1929